M. lutea may refer to:

 Malephora lutea, a succulent plant
 Malthopsis lutea, a bottom-dwelling fish
 Mangelia lutea, a sea snail
 Marginella lutea, a margin shell
 Markhamia lutea, a plant native to eastern Africa
 Massilia lutea, a gram-negative bacterium
 Mbipia lutea, a cichlid endemic to Lake Victoria
 Melaleuca lutea, a dicotyledonous plant
 Melanella lutea, a sea snail
 Mesolimnophila lutea, a crane fly
 Mitra lutea, a miter snail
 Mitrasacme lutea, a flowering plant
 Monochaetia lutea, a fungus that forms its spores in a sac-like ascus
 Monopsis lutea, a herbaceous plant
 Mordellistena lutea, a tumbling flower beetle
 Mordellochroidea lutea, a tumbling flower beetle
 Motacilla lutea, an insectivorous passerine
 Musa lutea, a gigantic herb
 Myceliophthora lutea, a fungus that forms its spores in a sac-like ascus
 Mycoacia lutea, a corticioid fungus
 Myrmicaria lutea, an ant with seven-segmented antennae